Brem is a surname. Notable people with the surname include:

 Eva-Maria Brem (born 1988), Austrian alpine ski racer
 Marty Brem (born 1959), Austrian singer, record executive, and entrepreneur
 Rolf Brem (1926–2014), Swiss sculptor, illustrator, and graphic artist
 Wilhelm Brem (born 1977), Paralympic biathlete and cross-country skier